Chinese calligraphy tattoos are tattoos of Chinese characters in a calligraphic style. Today, Chinese calligraphy tattoos can be found worldwide.

Calligraphy
Chinese calligraphy is the stylized, artistic writing of Chinese characters; the written form of Chinese that unites the languages spoken in China. Calligraphy is considered supreme among the visual arts in China and sets the standard for which Chinese painting is judged. Chinese calligraphy and painting are closely related.

History
In pre-modern China, textual tattoos were used as a punishment for criminals. Criminals would get textual tattoos on their cheeks and foreheads of the crime that they committed and would therefore have their crime on display for the rest of their lives.

Tattoos of Chinese characters and Japanese kanji are common in the modern Western world; often the characters used are ungrammatical, meaningless or incorrectly drawn, as neither the tattooist nor the recipient understand the languages in question and merely choose the characters based on their aesthetic appearance.

See also
 Adoption of Chinese literary culture

References

Chinese calligraphy
Chinese characters
Tattoo designs